ŽKK Play Off Sarajevo is a women's basketball club from Sarajevo, Bosnia and Herzegovina.

Honours

Domestic
National Championships – 3

Bosnian First League:
Winner (3): 2016, 2017, 2022
Runners-up (3): 2014, 2015, 2018

Bosnian Cup
Winner (1): 2017
Runners-up (2): 2016, 2018

Notable former players
 Samantha Roscoe
 Bojana Vulić

External links
 
Profile at eurobasket.com
Profile at facebook.com

Sport in Sarajevo
Women's basketball teams in Bosnia and Herzegovina